Al-Ameen Engineering College (AAP) is  a private self-financing college situated at Kulappully, Palakkad District. It is the first private self-financing college to start in Palakkad, Kerala. The college was established in 2003 managed by Al Ameen Educational Trust Under guidance of Chairman Sri C P A Bava Haji and Secretary Er. Kamarudheen.K.P. The institution is affiliated to University of Calicut and KTU.

History 
The college started functioning in 2003 as the first private self-financing college of Palakkad .It offers bachelor in technology courses in four branches (Mechanical Engineering, Civil Engineering, Electrical & Electronics Engineering and Electronics & Communication Engineering). All the main of international courses are approved by AICTE.

Facilities

Library 
AEC has a collection of text books and research materials in the library along with local and national magazines and dailies in engineering and general information. Wide study area & supporting staff are available with the library and students can also use the " May I Help You Desk" .

Language lab 

Language lab and class room are available for students to enhance their communication skills which are a pre-requisite for any interviews and entrepreneurship training  for students are starting soon with the help of Technical Education Department, Kerala.

Hostel 
AEC has three separate residential buildings for boys, girls and staff governed by staff inside the campus. Further there is a feedback mechanism which can be used to report any untoward incident to the management

Cyber Center 
AEC has a Cyber center to provide computing support to entire user community.

Store 
A general store facility is also available for study materials and stationery items for students.

Conveyance 
AEC offer conveyance facility for Day scholars with Bus services from major towns in Palakkad, Malappuram and Thrissur Districts. Since the railway station is only a couple of miles away  free Bus service is also available from Shoranur RLY station to college in morning and evening scheduled to match with train arrivals.

Mobile phone use 
Al-Ameen Engineering college has a liberal view on the use of mobile phone on the campus. The use of Phone is only restricted in class room during class time only and can be used outside the class during interval time.

Extra curricular activities

NSS unit
Al Ameen Engineering College has a unit of National Service Scheme. Students can join from their second year. NSS unit organizes various social services and increases the interaction between members.

Arts and sports
Students From AEC regularly participate in Calicut University youth festival. Also college began to celebrate Arts day in the Name "Aarambh" from 2014.

Campus automation
A web portal is opened for students to share study materials and latest news. All students can log in using personal user id and password.

Campus location
The college is in Kulapully near Shoranur railway station alongside the Palakad-Thrissur state highway.

References 

Private engineering colleges in Kerala
Colleges affiliated with the University of Calicut
Universities and colleges in Palakkad district
Educational institutions established in 2003
2003 establishments in Kerala